Principense Creole, also called lunguyê creole ("creole of the island") by its native speakers, is a Portuguese creole language spoken by a community of some four thousand people in São Tomé and Príncipe, specifically on the island of Príncipe. There are two Portuguese creoles on the island of São Tomé, Angolar and Forro. Today, younger generations of São Toméans are not likely to speak Principense, which has led to its fast decline and moribund status. It is mostly spoken by the elderly (Ethnologue gives a figure of approximately 200 native speakers in total), while most of the island's community speaks noncreole Portuguese; some also speak another, closely related creole, Forro.

Principense presents many similarities with the Forro on São Tomé and may be regarded as a Forro dialect. Like Forro, it is a creole language heavily lexified by Portuguese with substrates of Bantu and Kwa.

References

Further reading

External links
 APiCS Online - Survey chapter: Principense

Lunguye
Portuguese-based pidgins and creoles
Príncipe
Portuguese language in Africa